Astorville/Lake Nosbonsing Water Aerodrome  is located on Lake Nosbonsing, Ontario, Canada and is  east northeast of Astorville.

References

Airports in Nipissing District
Seaplane bases in Ontario